The fourth season of the American drama/adventure television series Highlander began airing 25 September 1995 and finished on 26 May 1996. The series continues to follow the adventures of Duncan MacLeod, a 400-year-old Immortal who can only die if he is beheaded. MacLeod is involved in the Game, an ongoing battle during which all Immortals have to behead each other until only one is left.

Cast

Main cast
 Adrian Paul ... Duncan MacLeod
 Stan Kirsch ... Richie Ryan
 Jim Byrnes ... Joe Dawson

Supporting cast
 
 Soumaya Akaaboune ... Aliya
 Philip Akin ... Charlie DeSalvo
 Sean Allan ... Simon Killian
 Guy Amram ... Kelly
 Eileen Barrett ... Alice Markum
 Veronique Baylaucq ... Annie
 Kabir Bedi ... Kamir
 Luc Bernard ... Inspector Deon 
 Wolfgang Bodison ... Andrew Cord
 Crispin Bonham-Carter ... Danny Cimoli
 Stéphane Boucher ... Edward Bellamy
 Geoffroy Boutan ... Claude Massanet 
 Benjamin Boyer ... David Shapiro 
 Chris Bradford ... Young Joe Dawson
 Jeremy Brudenell ... Robert de Valicourt
 Patrick Burgel ... Albert 
 Lisa Butler ... Melissa 
 Nadia Cameron ... Rebecca Horne
 Nicholas Campbell ... Kit O'Brady
 Sean Campbell ... Sergeant Merion 
 Valeria Cavalli ... Dominique 
 Nicola Cavendish ... Queen Anne
 Carl Chase ... Robert Davis / 2 episodes
 Byron Chief-Moon ... James Coltec
 Rae Dawn Chong ... Claudia Jardine
 Garrison Chrisjohn ... Dr. Weldon
 Ewan "Sudsy" Clark ... George Lalonde
 Morgan Cooke ... Antoine
 Luc Corbeil ... Merriman
 Garvin Cross ... Ray
 Roger Daltrey ... Hugh Fitzcairn 
 Stephen Dimopoulos ... Vince Petrovic 
 Tim Dixon ... Harry 
 Vernon Dobtcheff ... Hamad
 Yan Epstein ... Jean Dumar
 Ben Feitelson ... Nasir Al Deneb 
 Michel Feller ... Mikel 
 Myles Ferguson ... Kenny
 Brent Fidler ... Jeremy Beaufort
 Shannon Finnegan ... Sarah 
 Roland Gift ... Xavier St. Cloud
 Elizabeth Gracen ... Amanda / 5 episodes
 Manuel Guillot ... Emile 
 Anna Hagan ... Mary MacLeod
 Ron Halder ... Walter Graham
 Jamie Harris ... Daniel Geiger
 Phil Hayes ... Alan Wells
 Rachel Hayward ... Valerie Meech 
 Ocean Hellman ... Alexa Bond
 Fred Henderson ... Desantis
 Tim Henry ... Jim Rainey
 Anna Hogan ... Mary MacLeod
 Laurie Holden ... Debra Campbell
 Lisa Howard ... Anne Lindsey / 2 episodes
 Peter Hudson ... James Horton
 Anthony Hyde ... Nathan Stern 
 Robert Iseman ... Mike 
 Michael J. Jackson ... Sean Burns / 2 episodes 
 Liliana Komorowska ... Mara Leonin
 Simon Kunz ... Damon Case
 Darcy Laurie ... Harry Kant
 Kevin Lesmister ... Earl of Welsley
 Justin Louis ... Peter Kanis
 Roger Lumont ... Marco Mastina 
 David Mackay ... Gremio
 Laura Marine ... Nancy Goddard 
 Sue Mathew ... Vashti
 Scott McNeil ... Robert MacLeod 
 Kevin McNulty ... David Markum
 Graham McTavish ... Charlie 
 Travis MacDonald ... Mark Roszca
 Andrew MacGregor ... Donal
 Patrick Mille ... Jean Philippe de LeFaye III 
 Kristin Minter ... Rachel MacLeod / 3 episodes
 Billy J. Mitchell ... Brian McSwain 
 Alison Moir ... Diane Terrin
 Robert Moloney ... Kevin McSwain
 Romina Mondello ... Irina Galati 
 Gresby Nash ... Andrew Donnelly
 Carsten Norgaard ... Kanwulf 
 Tracy Olson ... Lord Sewell 
 Peter Outerbridge ... Paul Kinman
 Cécile Pallas ... Gina de Valicourt
 Molly Parker ... Alice Ramsey
 Gerard Plunkett ... James Bailey
 Michael Preston ... Terence Kincaid
 Benjamin Ratner ... Bryce Korland
 Jeffrey Renn ... Young Ian Bancroft
 Callum Keith Rennie ... Tyler King
 Kim Restell ... Julie
 Christine Rivere ... Nadia
 Struan Rodger ... Bonnie Prince Charlie
 Greg Rogers ... Detective Sheridan
 Ricco Ross ... Kassim 
 Jenafor Ryane ... Alicia
 Karim Salah ... Boadin Al Deneb 
 George Salmon ... James
 William Samples ... Bruce
 Tony Scanling ... Lord Keating
 Dougray Scott ... Warren Cochrane
 Tomer Sisley ... Reza
 Veena Sood ... Shandra Devane / 2 episodes
 Brent Stait ... Colonel Ramsey
 Jill Teed ... Kaayla Brooks
 Carla Temple ... Denise
 Venus Terzo ... The Duchess 
 John Tierney ... Angus
 Stacey Travis ... Agent Delaney
 Stephen Tremblay ... Jacob Galati / 2 episodes
 Yee Jee Tso ... Gerald
 Ann Turkel ... Kristin 
 Christine Upright-Letain ... Andrea Henson 
 Emmanuelle Vaugier ... Maria Alcobar
 Pruitt Taylor Vince ... Mikey Bellows 
 Louise Vincent ... Lina Cimoli
 Matthew Walker ... Ian MacLeod 
 Jesse Joe Walsh ... Jack Shapiro / 2 episodes
 Dave 'Squatch' Ward ... Cisco
 Marc Warren ... Morgan d'Estaing
 Alec Willows ... Martin Millay 
 Peter Wingfield ... Methos / 8 episodes
 Joel Wirkkunen ... McPhee

Episodes

Home media

References

External links
 Highlander: The Series episode list at Epguides
 Highlander: The Series episode list at the Internet Movie Database

4
1995 Canadian television seasons
1996 Canadian television seasons
1995 French television seasons
1996 French television seasons